The Morgan District Brigade was an administrative division of the North Carolina militia during the American Revolutionary War.  This unit was established by the North Carolina Provincial Congress on May 17, 1782, and disbanded at the end of the war.  The commander was Brigadier General Charles McDowell.

Regiments
The following are the North Carolina militia regiments that were part of the Morgan District Brigade, along with the dates established and disestablished.

Davidson County Regiment
The Davidson County Regiment was created on May 16, 1783 when the North Carolina General Assembly created Davidson County out of Cherokee Lands in what is now central Tennessee. All officers were appointed and commissioned by the Governor.  It was commanded by Colonel Anthony Bledsoe.   This unit did not see any action in the Revolutionary War. This Davidson County became part of Tennessee.  It was named for Colonel William Lee Davidson, who was killed at the Battle of Cowan's Ford during the American Revolution.  (Note: This county should not be confused with Davidson County, North Carolina, which was not created until 1848.

Greene County Regiment
The Green County Regiment was created on April 26, 1783 by the North Carolina General Assembly out of part of the Washington County Regiment.  It was commanded by Colonel Joseph Harden, Sr. and Colonel Alexander Outlaw.  The Green County Regiment was active until the end of the war. Because it was created so late, none of its units participated in any battles or skirmishes.

Engagements

References

North Carolina militia
1782 establishments in North Carolina